GBSD may refer to:
Governor Baxter School for the Deaf
Ground Based Strategic Deterrent